Vira Pratapa Purushottama Deva (Odia: ବୀରପ୍ରତାପ ପୁରୁଷୋତ୍ତମ ଦେବ) was the second Gajapati emperor of Odisha who ruled from 1467 to 1497 C.E. He was the second ruler from the Suryavamsa Gajapati Empire. His father Gajapati Kapilendra Deva Routaraya chose him as his heir to rule the Gajapati Empire at the banks of river Krishna where he breathed his last. This decision infuriated the elder brother Hamvira Deva who was a battle hardened and successful warrior fulfilling the task of conquering the southern territories and expeditions against the kingdom of Vijayanagara as wished by his father.

There is a legend that when, under divine guidance, Kapilendra Deva announced that he was naming Purushottama as heir apparent, the eighteen older sons in anger threw spears at Purushottama, all of which missed. Purrushotama Deva is also the lead character of the legend of Kanchi Kaveri Upakhyana (poem) written by the poet Purushottama Dasa in sixteenth century and later translated to Bengali by the Bengali poet Rangalal Bandyopadhyay. This legend is also popular among the Hindu devotees of the Jagannath worship tradition of Odisha.

Military achievements and territorial expansions  
Hamvira Deva ( eldest son of  Kapilendra Dev and heir to throne) revolted against Purrushotama as he ascended the throne of the empire. Purrushotama had a militarily advantageous fortification of Cuttack's Barabati fort, which in turn also was protected by a string of other extensive fortifications and camps of the Gajapati forces. To make matters worse, Saluva Narasimha of Vijayanagara had attacked and seized portions of the Gajapati Empire like Kondapalli and Rajamundry amidst this internal conflict of the ruling family.

Conflict with Hamvira Deva and Bahamani Sultanate (1467–1472 AD) 
Hamvira solicited a treaty with the Gajapati's enemy, Bahamani Sultan Muhammad Shah Lashkari or Muhammad Shah III. Willing to capture Rajamundry and Kondapalli, Muhammad Shah placed conditions for Hamvira Deva to accept his suzerainty when he becomes the ruler of Odisha and cede the desired territories from his father's empire. This deal between Hamvira and Muhammad Shah has been mentioned in the works of Ferishta and Sayid AliTaba Taba. The Bahamani Sultan sent his commander Hussain Bheiry with troops to support Hamvira in toppling Purrushotama. Gaining the support of the Bahamani forces, Hamvira Deva declared himself Gajapati in the year 1472. Purrushotama lost more than half of his father's empire in the initial years to Hamvira and Bahamani forces. Hamvira became a doppelganger Gajapati in the southern portions of Odisha and tried to invade the capital of Odisha ruled by his brother but was defeated.

Retrieval of lost territories from Bahamanis in 1476–1484 AD 
Hamvira had ceded Rajamundry and Kondapalii to the Bahamani sultanate in which Hussain Bheiry, was appointed as the governor and Hamvira ruled as a vassal king under them. In the year, 1476 Bahamani sultanate became weak due to internal conflicts and a severe famine. Using this situation as a perfect opportunity, Purrushotama Deva launched an offensive from the north and defeated his elder brother Hamvira, expelled the Bahamani garrisons and recaptured Rajamundry and Kondapalli to his empire. Ferishta writes that due to the severe mismanagement amidst the famine in the regions of Telegana until Rajamundry by the Bahamani rulers, Saluva Narasimha of Vijayanagara had aided some internal rebellions. Sayid AliTaba Taba writes when Purrushotama's forces arrived in the region, the garrison at Kondavidu fort rebelled and killed their general before making Hamvira in charge. Hamvira not only surrendered to his brother but also resolved to help him in his further expeditions.

An inscription of Purushottam Deva dating 1484 states that Azam Khan gifted the village of Mutukumalli located in the Vinukonda taluq of Guntur district to Purushottam on the occasion of a lunar eclipse. After dealing with the Bahamani forces and his rebellious elder brother, Purrushotama turned his attention towards southern territories, which Saluva Narasimha of Vijayanagara conquered amidst the internal conflict with his elder brother. He captured the Krishna- Godavari delta, parts of Telegana and expanded his march until Udayagiri fort where he imprisoned the Vijayanagara ruler.

War with Vijayanagara and hostilities by Saluva Narasimha Deva Raya 

While the civil war and conflict with the intervening Bahamanis were going on, the ruler of Vijayanagar, Saluva Narasimha Deva Raya to seize the opportunity for regaining the lost territories of that kingdom from Odisha Gajapati. The Vijayanagar ruler declared war on Odisha in the year 1468 and attacked the southern fortified territories of Udayagiri and Chandragiri situated in and around today's Nellore district. In the initial attempt and as in corroboration with the legend of Kanchi-Kaveri expedition, the Odia forces lost their ground and were defeated while many of them losing their lives. Saluvabhuigayam, a Sanskrit literary work of the period records the exploits of the Vijayanagara kingdom against the Kalingas (Odisha Kingdom) while another reference is provided in the Varaha Purana that the General named Ishwara Nayaka captured the Udayagiri fort from the Odia forces stationed there on behalf of the Vijayanagar ruler. The Bahamanis had equally captured the parts of southern Odisha Kingdom named as Rajamundry and Kondavidu during the ongoing Gajapati civil war. The Muslim chronicle Burhan-i-Ma'sir states that the Narasimha Deva Raya advanced north with an army of 700,000 cursed infantry, 8,500 elephants like mountains of iron to capture Rajmahendry.

After the defeat of the Bahamanis, the surrender of Hamvira Deva and the recapture of Rajmahendry and Kondavidu forts, Purushottam Deva launched an attack on the southern regions to recapture the lost territories. It is comparable to the Kanchi Kaveri legend that the Gajapati actually failed to make much headway at the first attempt but in the second attempt he not only attacked Kanchi, the secondary capital of Vijayanagar, but also imprisoned Saluva Narasimha Deva. The Vijayanagar monarch was freed in only the exchange of Udayagiri and Chandragiri regions back to Gajapati and the marital alliance with the Gajapatis ensuring no further invasions from the Vijayanagar monarchy. While his return from the final Kanchi expedition, Gajapati Purushottama Deva brought idols of deities Uchchhishta Ganapati and Gopala that are now installed inside the Jagannath temple premises along with idols of goddesses like Tarini, Karunei and Barunei as symbols of his victory.

The famous legend of Kanchi-Kaveri expedition 
Purrushotama Deva's war in the south with Vijayanagar ruler Saluva Narasimha Deva Raya is immortalized through the legend of Kanchi – Kaveri Upakhyan in the Jagannath spiritual cult of Odisha.  According to the legend, Saluva Narasimha (also identified as Kalabargeswara) had sent emissaries to Odisha on the interest from Purrushotama Deva to marry his daughter Padmavati (also known as Rupambika). The emissaries had arrived on the auspicious day of Rath Yatra festival of lord Jagannath and witnessed Purrushotama Deva performing the sweeping ceremony on the chariot of the lord with a golden broomstick. Odisha's kings were known as Routa and Routaraya, which meant servant of and servant king in service of the lord Jagannath. The ritual of Chera Pahara or sweeping the lord's chariot on the auspicious occasion of Rath Yatra was a symbolic representation of the position of Odishan kings as the deputy of the lord who was declared as the real ruler of the empire. Infuriated by this act of sweeping beyond his understanding as reported by the emissaries, Saluva Narasimha sent a message that he would never give his daughter in marriage to a sweeper. This not only was an insult to Purrushotama Deva but also the deity Jagannath of Odisha.

Enraged by this insult, Purrushotama invaded southern territories of Kanchi and Kaveri River's adjoining areas which were controlled by Saluva Narasimha.  He was defeated and unsuccessful in the first attempt, returned disheartened as a broken man to his homeland Odisha and went straight to the Puri temple. He prayed to the lord there asking for his divine assistance in breaking the enemy lines. As per the legend, Lord Jagannath assured him that he along with his brother Balabhadra would ride with his army in disguise when he makes the second attempt. In the second attempt Kanchi was captured, Saluva Narasimha was defeated and his daughter Padmavati was brought as a prisoner. The legend further says that the gods Jagannath and Balarama walk ahead of the army. They ask a milk woman, Manika, for food and Jagannath gives his ring in pledge that Purushottama will pay for them. When Purushottama meets Manika, he rejoices that the gods go before him and honors her with the village Manika Patana. Blessed by the gods, he defeats Saluva Narasimha, conquers Kanchi and takes captive Princess Padmavati along with a statue of Ganesha and Gopala. Purushottama commands his prime minister to give the princess in marriage to a perfect sweeper. At the next Ratha Yatra, Purushottama sweeps out one of the chariots with a golden broom, the clever Chief Minister announces he has found the perfect sweeper for the Princess and the king marries his new queen of the empire of Odisha.

Constructive activities and cultural contribution 
During Purushottama Deva's reign there was a flourishing of poetry with a number of works which were written by himself in Sanskrit. Gajapati Purushottam Deva was a scholar of Sanskrit literature and is attributed to have written many scriptures on his own during this time.

The individual works of Purushottam Deva include;

 Abhinava Gitagovinda
 Nama Malika
 Mukti Chintamani
 Abhinava Venisamhara
 Gopalapuja Paddhati
 Durgotsav
 Bishnu Bhakti Kaladruma
 Sanskrit Dictionary called Trikanda Kosha

It was during his rule that the writer of Sahitya Darpan, Biswanath Mohapatra found a place in his court. Gajapati Purushotama Deva after his conquest of Kanchi and divine experience of Lord Jagannath, constructed a temple at Deulagaon village near Raibania fort in Balasore district. In the temple, he installed two granite stone idols of lord Jagannath and Balarama as the siblings riding on horse and dressed for war. Until this day both the deities are worshiped there as a memory of his victory over Kanchi with divine intervention.

Purushottama Deva established 16 Sasans (or local administration of Brahmins) on banks of river Mahanadi after his victory in war. Four of these existing villages of Elmapur, Patapur Sasan, Sriyapur Sasan and Satyabhamapur Sasan were donated to Brhamins by his four other queens Elma Devi, Patamahadevi, Sriyadevi and Satybhamadevi where lord Jagannath is still worshipped as deity Dadhibaman as a symbol of the victory.  The idols of Uchistha or Kamada Ganesha and Gopala brought as trophy of victory over Kanchi by Purushottama Deva are now placed in the premises of Jagannath Temple at Puri.  The Puri Jagannath temple's fortification walls like the inner wall Kurma Bedha and outer wall Meghanada Prachira were completed during the rule of Purusottama Deva though started by his father. The Gajapati encouraged folk dances presented as service to lord Jagannath at the temple. It is recorded that queen Padmavati received the Gopa Sandhi award for her services to lord Jagannath through her skilled dancing. The Nata Mandapa and Bhoga Mandapa were constructed in the Puri temple premises during the rule of Purushottama Deva. He also built the Sundara Madhava temple in Purushottampur of today's Ganjam district. The Gajapati also waved off marriage taxes from common people in the conquered territories of southern India that existed as an administrative norm before him. 

Gajapati Purushottama Deva not only managed to regain most of the lost territories from his inherited empire but also conquered new territories in the southern regions of India. Despite the dispute with his rebellious elder brother, he managed to establish Odisha as a major power player in Deccan and Southern India while the Bahamani and Vijayanagar empires contested for supremacy with him. He pardoned his brother Hamvira Deva and let him rule as a representative and vassal of the Gajapati Empire in the southern territories. He did not face any threat from the northern Muslim ruled kingdoms like Bengal or Jaunpur unlike his father and successor Prataprudra Deva who would eventually struggle to keep the empire intact while dealing with Krishna Deva Raya of Vijayanagar, Muslim States of Deccan India and Bengal. His minimal attention to the northern frontier led to Turks like Sehjada and Mallick capture Bengal without any threat. Purushottama Deva established complete military control over a vast region comprising Bengali, Telugu, Carnatic and Tamil speaking people, other than Odias and contributed to the aversion of any Muslim dynasty's direct rule in south eastern coastal provinces and territories of India in the 16th Century. Though his initial life was spent in battles, he managed to encourage and contribute to literature, cultural activities and temple construction projects. The Madala Panji temple records of Jagannath Temple at Puri state that Purushottama Deva made a donation of 2000 Kahanas of cowries to the temple which shows his devotion to lord Jagannath.

References

Further reading
 

History of Odisha
Cuttack
Puri
Jagannath
Jagannath Temple Complex
People from Odisha
15th-century Indian monarchs